"The Way Love Goes" is a song co-written, co-produced and performed by American contemporary R&B singer Brian McKnight. It was issued as the lead single from his eponymous debut album. The song peaked at number 11 on the Billboard Hot R&B/Hip-Hop Songs chart in 1992.

Personnel 
 Brandon Barnes – drums and keyboard programming 
 Louis Johnson – bass guitar 
 Brian McKnight – Rhodes electric piano, acoustic guitar and background vocals 
 Wah Wah Watson – electric guitar

Music video 

The official music video for the song was directed by Leta Warner.

Charts

Weekly charts

Year-end charts

References

External links 
 
 

1992 songs
1992 debut singles
Mercury Records singles
Brian McKnight songs
Song recordings produced by Brian McKnight
Songs written by Brian McKnight